Vitaliy Osharov (born 16 February 1980) is a Ukrainian fencer. He competed in the team épée event at the 2004 Summer Olympics.

References

External links
 

1980 births
Living people
Ukrainian male épée fencers
Olympic fencers of Ukraine
Fencers at the 2004 Summer Olympics
People from Bila Tserkva
Sportspeople from Kyiv Oblast